The Wiyot massacre refers to the incidents on February 26, 1860, at Tuluwat (on what is also known as Indian Island), near Eureka in Humboldt County, California. In coordinated attacks beginning at about 6 am, White settlers murdered 80 to 250 Wiyot people with axes, knives, and guns. The February 26 attacks were followed by similar bloody attacks on other Wiyot villages later that week.

Background
Immigrants had settled in the area since the California Gold Rush, during the 10 years prior to the massacre. The Wiyot were at this time a peaceful tribe. They had never fought with white settlers and were not expecting an attack. The killings followed two years of hostility by a group of local whites against the residents of Indian Island, numerous editorials in the local newspapers, and the formation of volunteer militia groups.  Hostility had developed between local Indians and the settlers, who let their cattle stray onto Indian lands.  Indians used the cattle, and the cattle owners retaliated. On the night of 26 February 1860, a small group of settlers crossed Humboldt Bay, and to avoid drawing attention from nearby Eureka residents, many of whom may not have condoned the killings, performed the attack primarily with hatchets, clubs and knives. Guns were also used, with some Eureka residents reported hearing shots that night, but knowledge of the attack was not widespread at the time. News accounts report only adult men being shot, with handheld weapons used against women and children.

Deaths
Based upon Wiyot Tribe estimates, 80 to 250 Wiyot people were murdered. Another estimate states the number of American Indian people killed at 150. Because most of the adult able-bodied men were away gathering supplies as part of continuing preparation for the World Renewal Ceremony, nearly all the Wiyot men murdered are believed to have been older men, which is one reason why the Wiyot were largely defenseless. The celebration usually lasted seven to ten days, and the men traditionally left at night for the supplies while the elders, women and children slept. That is why most victims were children, women and older men.

Arcata's local newspaper, the Northern Californian, described the scene as follows:
Blood stood in pools on all sides; the walls of the huts were stained and the grass colored red. Lying around were dead bodies of both sexes and all ages from the old man to the infant at the breast. Some had their heads split in twain by axes, others beaten into jelly with clubs, others pierced or cut to pieces with bowie knives. Some struck down as they mired; others had almost reached the water when overtaken and butchered.

Survivors
There were few survivors. One woman, Jane Sam, survived by hiding in a trash pile. Two cousins, Matilda and Nancy Spear, hid with their three children on the west side of the island and later found seven other children still alive. A young boy, Jerry James, was found alive in his dead mother's arms.  Polly Steve was wounded badly and left for dead, but recovered. One of the few Wiyot men on the island during the attack, Mad River Billy, jumped into the bay and swam to safety in Eureka. Another woman, Kaiquaish (also known as Josephine Beach) and her eleven-month-old son William survived by not being on the island in the first place. Kaiquaish had set out in a canoe with her son to participate with the ceremonies, but became lost in the fog and was forced to return home before the attacks began.

Coordinated attacks

The Tuluwat/Indian Island massacre was part of a coordinated simultaneous attack that targeted other nearby Wiyot sites, including an encampment on the Eel River. On 28 February 1860, 40 more Wiyot were killed on the South Fork of the Eel River, and 35 more at Eagle Prairie a few days later. Though the attack was widely condemned in newspapers outside Humboldt County, no one was ever prosecuted for the murders.

Media reaction

Bret Harte wrote an editorial in The Northern California in Union (now Arcata, California) against the massacre and would soon need to leave the area due to the threats against his life. In the editorial, Harte wrote:
[A] more shocking and revolting spectacle was never exhibited to the eyes of a Christian and civilized people. Old women, wrinkled and decrepit, lay weltering in blood, their brains dashed out and dabbled with their long gray hair. Infants scarce a span long, with their faces cloven with hatchets and their bodies ghastly with wounds."

Several prominent local citizens also wrote letters to the San Francisco papers angrily condemning the attacks and naming suspected conspirators.

Investigation

The local sheriff, Barrant Van Ness, stated in a newspaper editorial published in the San Francisco Bulletin a few days after the massacre that the motive was revenge for cattle rustling. Ranchers in the inland valleys claimed as much as one-eighth of their cattle had been stolen or slaughtered by Indians over the previous year and one rancher, James C. Ellison, was killed while pursuing suspected rustlers in May 1859.  The area where the ranches were located was occupied by the Nongatl tribe, not the Wiyot, so the victims of the massacre would not have been responsible for any rustling.  Van Ness ended his written statement by saying he did not excuse the killers for their deeds.

Major Gabriel J. Rains, Commanding Officer of Fort Humboldt at the time, reported to his commanding officer that a local group of vigilantes had resolved to "kill every peaceable Indian - man, woman, and child." The vigilantes, calling themselves the Humboldt Volunteers, Second Brigade, had been formed in early February 1860 in the inland town of Hydesville, one of the ranching communities in the Nongatl area. They spent most of February "in the field" attacking Indians along the Eel River. A petition had been sent to California Governor John G. Downey asking that the Humboldt Volunteers be mustered into service and given regular pay. Downey refused the petition, stating that the U.S. Army was sending an additional Company of Regulars to Fort Humboldt.

A review of subsequent communications to Governor Downey revealed the true motive for the series of massacres that included Indian Island. The volunteer company commanded by Seman Wright wanted to become officially recognized as state militia, thereby becoming eligible for state funding. Hydesville rancher E. L. Davis, who had presided at the meeting where the company was formed, wrote Downey just after the massacre, stating that "This company is needed for the protection of lives & property & if we do not get it we will never ask the state again & I for one shall oppose paying any more state Taxes & [we will] fight our own battles in our own way-- exterminate the Indians from the face of the earth as far as this county is concerned. In fact, the little mess at Indian Island is only a beginning if we can't get our just protection from [the] state or [federal] government that the citizens are entitled to."

Consequences

The Wiyot Tribe said their people were not allowed to return to the island or their other lands. Soldiers from Fort Humboldt took many of the surviving Wiyot into protective custody at the fort, later transporting them to the Klamath River Reservation. They did not leave their former home without any resistance. Many Wiyots returned home soon after arriving at the Fort and attacks on White settlements were stronger in areas with sparse settlement of White people. Recently the Wiyot have been repurchasing the land in order to perform their annual World Renewal Ceremony.

See also
 Wiyot Tribe
 Henry P. Larrabee
 List of Indian massacres

Footnotes

Further reading
 Crandall, Joan, The Indian Island Massacre: An investigation of the Events that Precipitated the Wiyot Murders. M.A. Thesis, Humboldt State University, May 2005.
 Green, Rex D., Indian Island Massacre: A Decade of Events Leading to Genocide and Removal of the Wiyots, 1850-1860. Senior seminar paper. Humboldt State University, 2002.
 Karp, Michael T. The Indian Island Massacre: Place, Labor, and Environmental Change on California's Northwest. MA thesis. St. Louis University, 2012.
 Madley, Benjamin. An American Genocide. Yale University Press, 2016:282-284.
 Mullen, Lynette "When Thugs Ruled,", Lynette's NorCal History Blog, August 11, 2009.
 Rohde, Jerry. "Genocide and Extortion." North Coast Journal, February 25, 2010:10-17. Electronic version: http://www.northcoastjournal.com/humboldt/genocide-and-extortion/Content?oid=2130748

1860 crimes in the United States
Massacres in 1860
Massacres in the United States
Native American history of California
Massacres of Native Americans
Eureka, California
History of Humboldt County, California
Wiyot tribe
Bald Hills War
1860 in California
Axe murder
History of racism in California
February 1860 events
Stabbing attacks in the United States
California genocide